is a Japanese rock band formed in 2000. While their music can be mostly categorized as alternative rock or power pop, their music usually consists of an eclectic mix of genres, including jazz, disco and progressive rock.

Name origin

History

Formation and indie period (2000-2004)
Originally a cover band consisting of several junior high school friends, Fujifabric was founded by Masahiko Shimura and Takayuki Watanabe. After graduating from high school, the Fujiyoshida, Yamanashi natives began to take their musical interests more seriously and moved to Tokyo, and recruited Sachiko Tadokoro, Yūichi Katō and Akira Hagiwara for the band.

The first Fujifabric performance was in October 2001 at Club Eggsite (now known as Shibuya Eggman). After playing several successful club gigs, Fujifabric was signed to Song-Crux. Before the release of their debut mini-album, À la carte guitarist Akira Hagiwara and bassist Yūichi Katō left the band, and keyboardist Sachiko Tadokoro soon followed, leaving Shimura and Watanabe. Daisuke Kanazawa and Shinichi Katō were recruited into the band and in June 2003 the band released their second mini-album À la mode.

Major albums and hiatus (2004-2010)
The band soon caught the attention of several major record labels and a bidding war over the band ensued; finally in 2004 Fujifabric was signed to Toshiba-EMI and Sōichirō Yamauchi was brought into the band as lead guitarist. In January 2004 original founding member Takayuki Watanabe left the band due to creative differences; consequently Fusafumi Adachi joined and took over as drummer. In February 2004 Fujifabric completed the "À la.." trilogy and released their first major release, EP À la molto.

Fujifabric released their first full (and self-titled) studio album on November 10, 2004. Fujifabric peaked at No. 17 on Japan's Oricon Chart.

In 2005 the band released three more singles including the popular "Ginga" and "Akaneiro no Yūhi", the latter which featured the song "Shinkirō" and was used as the ending theme in the film Scrap Heaven. In November 2005, Fujifabric released their second full album Fab Fox which went on to peak at No. 8 on the Oricon charts, selling 13,152 units in its first week.

After a two-year hiatus, Fujifabric released the single "Aoi Tori", which peaked at No. 9 on the Oricon Chart and was the ending theme of the film Nightmare Detective. The band's subsequent single "Surfer King", featured Masahiko Kitahara, Nargo, and Gamo of Tokyo Ska Paradise Orchestra, and marked Fujifabric's first collaboration. The tracks were included on Fujifabric's third studio album, Teenager. The album came out on January 3, 2008, and peaked at No. 11. Their second most recent single, entitled "Sugar!!" was used as the theme music for J-Sports' Nippon Professional Baseball broadcasts for the 2010 season.

On December 24, 2009, vocalist Masahiko Shimura died due to unknown causes.  His final album as lead vocalist, titled Music, was released on July 28, 2010.

Memorial concert, label change, and new vocalist (2010-present)

Despite the death of their lead singer, the band continued with the remaining three members. In 2010, the band switched labels from EMI Music Japan to Sony Music Associated Records. The three remaining members performed a memorial concert in August 2010, Fujifabric Presents Fuji Fuji Fuji Q, which featured many friends of the band substituting as lead vocalist including Quruli, Kishidan, Puffy, Tamio Okuda, Polysics, and more.  The DVD and Blu-ray from this concert was released on July 20, 2011.  In August 2011, they announced that their sixth album, titled Star, would be released September 21 with lead guitarist Sōichirō Yamauchi as the new vocalist.

The lead track from their twelfth single, released on May 15, 2012, was the opening song for the anime Tsuritama.  The limited edition of this single includes a live DVD featuring the current lineup of Fujifabric performing tracks from Star.

Their latest album, Voyager, was released on March 6, 2013. One of the singles promoting the album, "Small World", was used as the 4th opening to the anime Space Brothers.

In 2014 they released two songs that were featured in anime: "Life" for the second season of Silver Spoon and "Blue" for the anime Blue Spring Ride.

Members

Current
 joined the band in January 2003, replacing the former keyboardist.

 joined the band at the same time as Kanazawa, in January 2003. He is the bassist of the band.

 joined Fujifabric in January 2004 as lead guitarist, and took over lead vocals following Shimura's death.

Former
 was the only remaining original member of Fujifabric, he was the lyricist, lead vocalist, and rhythm guitarist of the group. He died on December 24, 2009, of an unknown ailment.

 joined Fujifabric in January 2004 as a drummer. He was an employee of Ringo Shiina's individual office kuronekodow before joining. He left the band on March 27, 2006, and is now front man for his band "Marvelous."

Support
 - drummer for Kenichi Asai's JUDE and unkie

 - drummer for Tokyo Jihen

Discography

Studio albums
 Fujifabric (2004)
 Fab Fox (2005)
 Teenager (2008)
 Chronicle (2009)
 Music (2010)
 Star (2011)
 Voyager (2013)
 Life (2014)
 Stand!! (2016)
 F (2019)
 I Love You (2021)

Mini albums
 À la carte (2002)
 À la mode (2003)
 À la molto (2004)

Compilations
 Singles 2004-2009 (2010)

Singles
 "Sakura no Kisetsu" (2004)
 "Kagerō" (2004)
 "Akakiiro no Kinmokusei" (2004)
 "Ginga" (2005)
 "Niji" (2005)
 "Akaneiro no Yūhi" (2005)
 "Yaon Live Vol. 1" (2006, digital download)
 "Yaon Live Vol. 2" (2006, digital download)
 "Aoi Tori" (2007)
 "Surfer King" (2007)
 "Passion Fruit" (2007)
 "Wakamono no Subete" (2007)
 "Sugar!!" (2009)
 "Tsuredure Monochrome / Ryūsenkei" (2012)
 "Light Flight" (2012)
 "Small World" (2013)
 "LIFE" (2014)
 "Blue/WIRED" (2014)
 "Polaris" (2016)
 "Super!!" (2016)
 "Golden Time" (2019)
 "Rakuen (Fujifabric single)" (2021)

References

External links
 Fujifabric Official website
 Fujifabric at EMI Music Japan
 Fujifabric at Capitol Music

Japanese power pop groups
Japanese alternative rock groups
Japanese indie rock groups
Musical groups established in 2000
Sony Music Entertainment Japan artists
Musical groups from Yamanashi Prefecture